This is an incomplete list of Supreme Court of the United States cases in the area of patent law.

19th century

1900–1920

1921–1959

1960–1969

1970–1979

1980–1989

1990–1999

2000–2009

2010–2019

2020–2029

See also
 List of United States Supreme Court copyright case law
 List of United States Supreme Court trademark case law

References 
 Lisa Larrimore Ouellette, "Supreme Court Patent Cases", Written Description
 Donald S. Chisum, Tyler T. Ochoa, Shubha Ghosh, Mary LaFrance, Understanding Intellectual Property Law (2011)

Patent law
Patent
United States patent case law